Lewis P. Olds was a North Carolina lawyer and politician who served as North Carolina Attorney General from 1869 to 1870.

In 1868, he was offered the presidency of the University of North Carolina at Chapel Hill. Kemp P. Battle wrote, "As there was no treasury in sight from which a salary could be drawn, Mr. Olds wisely declined [the offer of the presidency]." According to Battle, Olds was the son-in-law of then-Governor William W. Holden. He represented Wake County in the North Carolina Senate in 1870-71, when he voted against removing his father-in-law from office.

President Ulysses S. Grant appointed Olds to be U.S. consul to St. Helena., where he served in 1876 and 1877.

Olds' first, Pauline Eugenia Olds, died of typhoid fever in 1864, at the age of 36. His second wife, Laura Haylander Olds, was committed to an insane asylum in April 1888, and died on March 11, 1895.

References

North Carolina lawyers
Republican Party North Carolina state senators
North Carolina Attorneys General
People from Wake County, North Carolina
Year of death missing
Year of birth missing